Amir Válá Meshkin is an architect, visual artist, singer, songwriter and producer residing in Australia.
As an architect, he is most noted for the design and construction of a surrealistic residence in Perth, Western Australia named Mel-Villa, which features the only 9 meter high periscope in a building in the Southern Hemisphere. This periscopic apparatus reflects an unobstructed view of the Swan River (Western Australia), as seen on the roof top of the residence, into the ground floor sitting area. He leads the electronic-rock-fusion collective ELVIRIA, featuring world-class instrumentalists and guest vocalists.

The ELVIRIA sound combines electronica, rock n' roll, fusion and world music; electronic sound manipulation and beats, psychedelic electronic music compositions, contemporary dance music stanzas; rock anthems and instrumentation; spoken word and free-form poetry, pop-operatic moments, orchestral string, brass and woodwind arrangements; the musical chords, scales, styles and languages of the different cultures and places of the world, multilingual singing representing Indigenous, Medieval, Arabic, Persian and other-worldly cultures, Bel canto ballads,  24-part vocal harmonies and exotic instruments.

ELVIRIA's debut album THE CITY OF SEARCH addresses the riddle of life and its oldest philosophical questions: "Where did we come from? Where are we going? And what's the role of humanity in the architecture of the universe?" THE CITY OF SEARCH addresses the riddle by adapting The Seven Valleys, a 19th-century poetic text elaborating on the age-honored tradition of the seven mystic stages encountered by individuals during their journey to divine consciousness. This is the first of a series of seven chronological albums, each set on a different continent and each exploring one of the spiritual stages described in The Seven Valleys.

References

Architects from Perth, Western Australia
Living people
Year of birth missing (living people)
Australian male singers
Australian record producers